Mariner's Wharf is a prominent landmark and tourist attraction in Hout Bay, South Africa. Situated between the beach and the adjacent harbor entrance, it was originally built in 1979 as workshops, storage and offices by Stanley Dorman for his fishing operations. Subsequently, due to a serious decline in the industry he decided to repurpose the structure, converting it into a harbor front emporium. Initially it consisted of a fresh fish market, an outdoor fish-and-chips bistro, sea-shanty restaurant as well as a small shop specializing in local seashells and souvenirs.

History

Chapman’s Peak Fisheries 
Stanley Dorman was born and raised in Hout Bay, starting his career with four fishing boats inherited from his uncle, Alfie Dorman. Prior to this, his forefathers, having immigrated to the Cape of Good Hope during the 1890s, farmed in and fished out of Hout Bay up to the mid-1950s. In 1965 he took over what had deteriorated into a moribund business called Chapman’s Peak Fisheries - and during the ensuing 30 years, developed it into what today is known as the Cape Coast Group of Companies.

Cape Coast, besides property acquisitions, eventually owned and operated a fleet of 17 trawler and lobster boats, a seafood factory and smokehouse, workshops, freezers, cold storage and national distribution depots. Dorman traveled to the continental United States for the first time in 1979, where, particularly inspired by Fisherman’s Wharf in San Francisco, he decided to create something similar in Hout Bay, eventuating in Mariner’s Wharf as it stands today.

Mariner’s Wharf harbor front emporium 
Mariner’s Wharf and its fish market (purposefully built around the hull of the historic trawler, the Kingfisher) officially opened on 22 November 1984, to become South Africa’s first harbor front emporium. 

Showcasing fish, fresh and frozen, as well as a vast array of associated products such as live lobsters, oysters and mussels, the sale of seaside gifts and marine-related artifacts complemented its fish market operations. In 1991, Dorman further expanded Mariner’s Wharf. A new addition was the upstairs nautically themed 350 seater Wharfside Grill restaurant with private dining cabins, Cray club cocktail bar and a long deck overlooking the nearby beach and north-western precincts of Hout Bay harbor.

The revamp also features a lifeboat salvaged from a local shipwreck, hoisted alongside the Wharfside Grill’s deck, a bakery, sushi bar and a wine and liquor store.  In turn, the ground floor, already popular for its busy fish ‘n chips bistro, was remodeled with separate antique, jewellery and shell shops for non-food items, evolving into Mariner’s Wharf becoming the international tourist attraction it is today. 

Due to the COVID-19 world pandemic the business closed its doors and retrenched most of its employees of many years, six weeks into the South African lockdown in the first week of May 2020. However, its doors were reopened a few weeks later when the lockdown level was lowered at the end of May 2020.

References

External links 
 Official website

Literature 
Fick, David S.: Entrepreneurship in Africa - A Study of Success. Page 113–114, Praeger (March 30, 2002), 

Tourist attractions in Cape Town